Pratylenchus goodeyi is a plant pathogenic nematode infecting bananas. It is native to the mountainous regions of Africa. There it is considered the second most devastating nematode after R. similis, especially under poor management.

References

External links 
 Nemaplex, University of California - Pratylenchus goodeyi

goodeyi
Plant pathogenic nematodes
Banana diseases